is a Japanese football player. He plays for Iwate Grulla Morioka, on loan from FC Tokyo.

Career
Sodai Hasukawa joined FC Tokyo in 2016. On May 22, he debuted in J3 League (v Kagoshima United FC).

References

External links

1998 births
Living people
Association football people from Tokyo
Japanese footballers
J1 League players
J2 League players
J3 League players
FC Tokyo players
FC Tokyo U-23 players
Iwate Grulla Morioka players
Association football defenders